Marcus Winn (born December 26, 1982) is a former American football defensive back.

College career
As a senior at the Alabama State University, Winn posted 89 tackles.

Pro career
Winn played two seasons with the Edmonton Eskimos of the Canadian Football League before being released in 2007.
Marcus Winn was signed by the Winnipeg Blue Bombers of the Canadian Football League in 2007.

References

1982 births
Living people
Canadian football linebackers
Alabama State Hornets football players
Edmonton Elks players
Players of American football from Jackson, Mississippi
Players of Canadian football from Jackson, Mississippi
Bloomington Extreme players
Winnipeg Blue Bombers players
Chicago Slaughter players